Jennifer Botterill,  (born May 1, 1979) is a Canadian former women's hockey player and current hockey broadcast television analyst who played for Harvard University, the Canadian national team, the Mississauga Chiefs, and the Toronto Aeros. She entered the ice hockey world after starting in the sport of ringette.

During her ice hockey career as a player, Botterill assisted on the game-winning goal in her final international game, Canada's 2-0 win over the United States for the gold medal in the 2010 Winter Olympics. She serves as a studio analyst for Sportsnet and Hockey Night in Canada telecasts in Canada and as a game and studio analyst for TNT in the United States.

Playing career

Botterill was born to Doreen McCannell and Cal Botterill. Her mother, Doreen, competed in the 1964 and 1968 Winter Olympics for Canada in speed skating. Her father, Cal, is a sports psychologist who  has advised NHL teams and works with Canadian Olympic athletes. Botterill's brother, Jason Botterill, played hockey and managed the Buffalo Sabres. 

In high school, she attended the National Sport School (Canada)

Botterill graduated from Harvard University in 2003 with a B.A. Psychology (with Honors). On May 5, 2012, she married hockey coach Adrian Lomonaco, and is a coach at Toronto Hockey School Journey To Excel

Ringette
Botterill grew up playing ringette in Canada. As a teenager she competed in the sport for Team Manitoba in Grande Prairie, Alberta, at the 1995 Canada Winter Games, a national multi-sport competition for elite, Canadian amateur athletes.

Collegiate
Botterill attended Harvard University and played for the Harvard Crimson women's ice hockey program from 1998 to 2003. Harvard and several media outlets recognize Botterill as U.S. college ice hockey's career scoring leader (149 goals, 170 assists, 319 points). The NCAA does not recognize her record because women's hockey was not an NCAA-sanctioned sport in Botterill's first two college seasons. She scored at least one point in 112 of her 113 career college games (including a streak of 80 consecutive games). She was the first player to win the Patty Kazmaier Award twice as the top player in U.S. women's college hockey. Botterill set an NCAA record (since tied) for most points in one game with 10. This was accomplished on January 28, 2003 versus Boston College.

Canadian Women's Hockey League
Botterill played for the Mississauga Chiefs and Toronto Furies of the Canadian Women's Hockey League. In 2007–08, she won the Angela James Bowl after winning the league scoring title with 61 points. She was voted the CWHL Top Forward and a CWHL Central All-Star; she won CWHL Top Scorer of the Month honours in February. In 2008-09, she was a CWHL First Team All-Star.

Botterill retired after the 2010-11 season. Her final game was the 2011 Clarkson Cup final, a 5–0 loss to the Montreal Stars. Despite playing just three seasons in the four-year-old CWHL, she retired as the league's second-best scorer with 160 points (in 79 games from 2007-08 to 2010-11). After winning the Angela James Bowl in 2007-08, she finished third in the league scoring race in both 2008-09 and 2010-11.

International
She won the silver medal in the 1998 Winter Olympics in Nagano in 1998 as the youngest player on the Canadian team. Later, she won the gold medal in the 2002 games in Salt Lake City, Utah, at the 2006 Winter Olympics in Turin, and at the 2010 Winter Olympics in Vancouver, playing forward. Botterill announced her retirement, on March 14, 2011. Her last appearance with Team Canada was on February 25, 2010 at the 2010 Olympic Games in Vancouver. Her final point was also on February 25 when, she assisted Marie-Philip Poulin on the gold medal-winning goal.

World Championship biography
1999, 2000, 2001, 2004, 2007 World Champion

2005, 2008, 2009 Silver Medallist

Career statistics
Career statistics are from USCHO.com, or Eliteprospects.com or the Team Canada Media Guide for 2009-10.

Regular season and playoffs

International

Awards and honours
 Angela James Bowl, 2007–08
 CWHL Top Forward, 2007–08
 CWHL First All-Star Team, 2008–09
 CWHL Central All-Stars, 2007–08

Accomplishments and notes
2006 Order of Manitoba

2001–02 & 2002–03 Winner of the Patty Kazmaier Award for the top female college ice hockey player in the United States. Only 2-time winner of the Award

2001 Female Athlete of the Year Award – Awarded by the Province of Manitoba (Botterill's mother, Doreen McCannell won the same award 36 years before)

1999 American Women's College Hockey Alliance Women's Ice Hockey Champion

1999 American Women's College Hockey Alliance All-Americans, First Team\

References

External links
Jennifer Botterill biography at Canoe.com
"Toronto Aeros Win Hockey Nationals", Canadian Association for the Advancement of Women and Sport and Physical Activity, March 13, 2005.

1979 births
Living people
Angela James Bowl winners
Canadian expatriates in the United States
Canadian women's ice hockey forwards
Harvard Crimson women's ice hockey players
Ice hockey people from Ottawa
Ice hockey people from Winnipeg
Ice hockey players at the 1998 Winter Olympics
Ice hockey players at the 2002 Winter Olympics
Ice hockey players at the 2006 Winter Olympics
Ice hockey players at the 2010 Winter Olympics
Medalists at the 1998 Winter Olympics
Medalists at the 2002 Winter Olympics
Medalists at the 2006 Winter Olympics
Medalists at the 2010 Winter Olympics
Members of the Order of Manitoba
Mississauga Chiefs players
Olympic gold medalists for Canada
Olympic ice hockey players of Canada
Olympic medalists in ice hockey
Olympic silver medalists for Canada
Patty Kazmaier Award winners
Toronto Furies players
Ringette players